The Bur (Buur) is a river in Yakutia (Sakha Republic), Russia.

The river flows north of the Arctic Circle across a lonely, desolate area devoid of settlements.  The river basin is mostly in Olenyoksky District, with the lower course section in Bulunsky District.

Course  
The Bur is a left tributary of the Olenyok. Its sources are in a hilly area of the North Siberian Lowland, in the vicinity of the sources of the Udya and the Buolkalakh. It flows across a marshy floodplain with small lakes, meandering strongly and flowing roughly eastwards north of the Beyenchime. The confluence is only a little downstream from the mouth of the Khorbusuonka in the opposite bank. 

The river is frozen between early October and late May.

Flora and fauna
The river flows north of the Arctic circle across swamps and forest-tundra. The  distribution of permafrost is continuous. 

The waters of the river are clean. Among the fish species found in the Bur lenok, muksun, nelma, omul, whitefish, taimen, grayling and pike deserve mention.

See also
List of rivers of Russia

References

External links 
Fishing & Tourism in Yakutia

Rivers of the Sakha Republic
North Siberian Lowland
Tributaries of the Olenyok